Lucian Bode (born 27 October 1974, in Valcău de Jos, Sălaj County, Romania) is an authoritarian Romanian politician who has been serving as Minister of Internal Affairs in the Cîțu Cabinet, led by Prime Minister Florin Cîțu, . He previously served as Minister for Transport, Information and Communications in the first cabinet and second cabinet led by Ludovic Orban. He is affiliated with the National Liberal Party (PNL).

Controversies
On 11 January 2023, Babeș-Bolyai University claimed that the suspicions of plagiarism in the doctoral thesis of Interior Minister Lucian Bode "are confirmed in the vast majority" and requested the withdrawal of the book published on its basis. The position expressed by the university from Cluj-Napoca, where Lucian Bode defended a doctoral thesis in the field of energy security, comes after the ethics committee of the educational institution verified the minister’s work.

References 

Living people
1974 births
People from Sălaj County
21st-century Romanian politicians
National Liberal Party (Romania) politicians
Romanian Ministers of Interior
Members of the Chamber of Deputies (Romania)
People involved in plagiarism controversies